You Ought to Know may refer to:

You Ought to Know... Phil Collins EP
You Oughta Know, song by Alanis Morissette